The 2016 Prudential U.S. Figure Skating Championships were held from January 15–24 in Saint Paul, Minnesota at the Xcel Energy Center and Bloomington Ice Garden. Medals were awarded in the disciplines of men's singles, ladies singles, pair skating, and ice dancing at the senior, junior, novice, intermediate, and juvenile levels. The results were part of the U.S. selection criteria for the 2016 Four Continents, 2016 World Junior Championships, and the 2016 World Championships.

The host was announced in November 2012.

Qualifying 
Competitors qualified at regional and sectional competitions held from October to November 2015.

Following sectional competitions, U.S. Figure Skating published a list of skaters who had qualified or earned a bye. Skaters who subsequently withdrew included Jason Brown, Jordan Moeller, Joshua Farris, Richard Dornbush, and Lydia Erdman / Alexey Shchepetov.

Medal summary

Senior

Junior

Novice

Intermediate

Juvenile

Senior results

Senior men

Senior ladies

Senior pairs
Tarah Kayne / Daniel O'Shea won both segments to win their first national title by nearly 15 points, with a total score of 211.65 points. Defending champions Alexa Scimeca / Chris Knierim earned silver with a total of 196.80 points. Marissa Castelli / Mervin Tran placed third in both segments to earn bronze, and Madeline Aaron / Max Settlage maintained their fourth-place standing from the short to earn pewter.

Senior ice dance
Maia Shibutani / Alex Shibutani overcame a 0.47 point deficit from the short dance to overtake defending champions Madison Chock / Evan Bates and win their first senior national title.

Junior results

Junior men

Junior ladies

Junior pairs

Junior ice dance

Novice results

Novice men

Novice ladies

Novice pairs

Novice ice dance

International team selections

Winter Youth Olympics 
The team for the 2016 Winter Youth Olympics was announced in October 2015.

Four Continents
The team for the 2016 Four Continents Championships was announced on January 24, 2016.

World Junior Championships 
The team for the 2016 World Junior Championships was announced on January 24, 2016. Nathan Chen withdrew due to injury and was replaced by first alternate Tomoki Hiwatashi.

World Championships 
The team for the 2016 World Championships was announced on January 24, 2016. Nathan Chen withdrew due to injury and was replaced by first alternate Grant Hochstein.
On March 23, it was announced that Polina Edmunds withdrew due to an injury and first alternate, Mirai Nagasu will replace her.

References

External links
 
 Schedule of events  at IceNetwork

2016
2016 in figure skating
2016 in American sports
January 2016 sports events in the United States
Sports competitions in Saint Paul, Minnesota
2016 in sports in Minnesota
21st century in Saint Paul, Minnesota